SkyKing Limited was a scheduled passenger airline based on the Turks and Caicos Islands.

History 
In December 1994, two entrepreneurs from the Turks and Caicos Islands, Harold Charles (a native of Haiti) and John Shearer, joined forces putting together a hangar facility and 2 small piston-engine aircraft to form a small charter airline. The first revenue flight took place in January 1995. In 1996 scheduled services began using a mixed fleet of a total of eight Cessna 400 and Piper PA-23 aircraft, after which larger Short 360 aircraft were added. Over the following years, SkyKing bought some Beechcraft 1900, which eventually became the only aircraft type in the fleet.

In 2008, SkyKing was acquired by rival Air Turks and Caicos. Since 22 October of that year, all SkyKing operations were merged into its new owner. Subsequently, the SkyKing brand was discontinued.

Destinations 
At the time of closure, SkyKing operated scheduled flights to the following destinations:

Dominican Republic
Puerto Plata - Gregorio Luperón International Airport
Santiago de los Caballeros - Cibao International Airport

Haiti
Cap-Haïtien - Cap-Haitien International Airport

Jamaica
Kingston - Norman Manley International Airport

Turks and Caicos Islands
Grand Turk - JAGS McCartney International Airport secondary hub
Providenciales - Providenciales International Airport hub
South Caicos - South Caicos Airport

Fleet 
In October 2008, SkyKing operated the following aircraft, which were subsequently integrated into the Air Turks and Caicos fleet.
4 Beechcraft 1900

References

External links 
Official website (defunct)

Defunct airlines of the Turks and Caicos Islands
Airlines established in 1994
Airlines disestablished in 2008
1994 establishments in the Turks and Caicos Islands
2008 disestablishments in North America